Wąwolnica may refer to the following places in Poland:
Wąwolnica, Lower Silesian Voivodeship (south-west Poland)
Wąwolnica, Lublin Voivodeship (east Poland)